Desulfovibrio aminophilus  is a Gram-negative, mesophilic, non-spore-forming, amino acid degrading and sulfate-reducing bacterium from the genus of Desulfovibrio which has been isolated from an anaerobic lagoon from a dairy wastewater treatment plant in Santa Fe de Bogota in Colombia.

References

Further reading

External links
Type strain of Desulfovibrio aminophilus at BacDive -  the Bacterial Diversity Metadatabase	

Bacteria described in 1999
Desulfovibrio